Kammerstein is a municipality in the district of Roth in Bavaria in Germany.

References

Roth (district)